Santiago "Yago" Iglesias Estepa (born 6 October 1982) is a Spanish football manager, who is currently in charge of Zamora.

Career
Born in Palmeira, Ribeira, Galicia, Iglesias worked at CD Boiro and Pontevedra CF B before starting his senior managerial career with CSH Palmeira, in the Tercera Autonómica, in 2010. After being an assistant at Portonovo SD, he joined Raúl Caneda's staff at Al-Ittihad FC.

Iglesias returned to Spain in January 2013, after being retained in Saudi Arabia due to paperwork problems. On 22 July of that year, he took over Atlético de Riveira also in the regional leagues.

In July 2015, after working with Santiago de Compostela CF's Juvenil squad, Iglesias was named manager of Noia CF in Tercera División. On 21 June of the following year, he took over fellow league team SD Compostela.

In 2020, after reaching three consecutive play-offs with Compos, Iglesias' side finally achieved promotion to Segunda División B, returning to the category after four seasons. He renewed his contract for a further campaign in August of that year.

In May 2021, Iglesias left Compostela after five years, and took over Primera División RFEF side Zamora CF on 23 November.

Managerial statistics

References

External links

1982 births
Living people
Sportspeople from Santiago de Compostela
Spanish football managers
Primera Federación managers
Segunda División B managers
Tercera División managers
SD Compostela managers
Zamora CF managers